Sociedade Esportiva Palmeiras is a Brazilian football team.

Palmeiras may also refer to:

Football teams
 Sociedade Esportiva Palmeiras (women's football), the female section of the main Palmeiras club
 Palmeiras Nordeste Futebol, a Brazilian football team
 Associação Atlética das Palmeiras, a defunct Brazilian football team
 Palmeiras Quelimane, a Mozambican football club

Places
 Palmeiras, Bahia
 Palmeiras de Goiás
 Palmeiras do Tocantins

See also 
 Palmeiras River (disambiguation)
 Palmares (disambiguation)